Dimitris "Mimis" Fotopoulos (8 April 1913 – 29 October 1986) was a Greek actor, writer, poet, and artist.

He was born in Zatouna, Gortynia, Arcadia. He studied at the Dramatic School of National Theatre (Δραματική Σχολή του Εθνικού Θεάτρου). He also studied at the Philosophical School at the University of Athens until his second year in 1933. He headed a theatrical company from 1952 and an actor from 1960.

He died on 29 October 1986 in Athens, from a heart attack, aged 73.

Selected filmography
 100,000 Pounds (1948) ..... Kleomenis Finins
 To pontikaki (1954) ..... Babis
 Oute gata oute zimia (1954) ..... Stelios Molfetas
 The Counterfeit Coin (1955) ..... beggar
 Golfo (1955) ..... Giannos
 Madame X (1956) ..... Dimitrakis Perisaris
 The Fortune Teller (1956) ..... Spyros Tsardis
 Ta kitrina gantia (1960) ..... Leandros
 Treloi polyteleias (1963) ..... Kyriakos
 Allos gia to ekatommyrio (1964) ..... Savvas
 O periergos (1982) ..... hotel manager

Writings
He wrote books:
 Bouloukia (Μπουλούκια) 1940
 Imitonia (Ημιτόνια) 1960
 Sklira trioleta (Σκληρά τριολέτα) 1961
 25 Chronia Theatro (25 χρόνια θέατρο = 25 Years of Theatre) 1958, autobiography
 To Potami Tis Zois Mou (Το ποτάμι της ζωής μου = The River of My Life) 1965, autobiography
 Ena Koritsi Sto Parathyro (Ένα κορίτσι στο παράθυρο) 1966, theatrical work
 Pelopidas O Kalos Politis (Πελοπίδας ο καλός πολίτης = Pelopidas The Good Citizen), theatrical work, 1976

His important works were from Chekhov, Ibsen and from Shakespeare at the Royal Garden in 1956. He appeared in hundreds of comedies other than his dramatic roles. He appeared in such films as Kalpiki Lira, Laterna, Ftochia Ke Filotimo, and Ta Kitrina Gandia.

Affiliations

 D.S. of the Hellenic Actors Guild, member
 Panhellenic Union of the Free Theatricals, member
 D.S. Armed Decree, president

External links

Profile, movies.channel.aol.com
Profile, moviemagnet.net

1913 births
1986 deaths
Greek male film actors
Greek comedians
Greek male stage actors
National Liberation Front (Greece) members
Recipients of the Order of George I
Gold crosses of the Order of George I
20th-century Greek male actors
20th-century comedians
People from Dimitsana